Andre Jordan is a British artist, writer and poet. He is a regular columnist on the disability website produced by the BBC, "Ouch!", and contributes art to the garden blog, "A Way to Garden."

Website
Jordan maintains the website, "www.abeautifulrevolution.com", a forum that showcases his verse and poetry, in addition to documenting his struggles with a major depressive disorder. As of 2010, the site has received over two million hits.

Writing
Jordan has had two books published: Heaven Knows I'm Miserable Now and If You're Happy and You Know It.

Design
Jordan has also stated that he designs cards and "stuff" on his personal website and in the "Shop" section of the website, Jordan sells textiles, lithographs and antique rugs, among other items.

Personal life
On his website, Jordan reveals: "My wife and I live with a blind pitbull called Little Man, a feral Sharpei called Mama, a mean mean cat called Nine, and a strange feral librarian robot cat called Grace." Jordan adds in conclusion, "Life is good."

See also
 Mood disorder
 Creativity
 Creativity and mental illness

References

External links
 A Beautiful Revolution
 The Ouch! Blog

Year of birth missing (living people)
Living people
English artists
English male poets
People with mood disorders